Richmond Park is a football stadium in Dublin, Ireland. Situated in the Dublin suburb of Inchicore, it is the home ground of League of Ireland side St Patrick's Athletic F.C. (also known as St Pat's). The area where the ground now stands was formerly used as a recreational area by the British Army, who were stationed at the nearby Richmond Barracks, both named after Charles Lennox, 4th Duke of Richmond the barracks having since been demolished.

History
After the creation of the Irish Free State, and therefore the removal of the British Army, the ground lay idle for 3 years before League of Ireland club Brideville began using the ground in 1925.  In 1930 Brideville were forced to move to Harolds Cross Greyhound Stadium to accommodate St Patrick's Athletic moving in. St. Pats continue to use and develop the ground until 1951 when they entered the League of Ireland.  The league deemed the ground unsuitable and St. Pats were forced to use a variety of grounds in Dublin as they fought to upgrade Richmond Park. In 1960, after serious development, the ground played host to St Pat's first home league game in Inchicore.  The ground closed for redevelopment in May 1989, however, due to St Pats hitting financially difficulties they did not return until 5 December 1993.

The ground lies behind a row of terraced housing in a natural valley and is often used for Republic of Ireland underage and women's teams. It staged the League of Ireland Cup final in 1982 and 2003. It has played host to two Leinster Senior Cup finals, as well as many junior and intermediate finals.  In 2001, 2002, 2003 and part of 2004 Shamrock Rovers played their home games in Richmond Park as tenants of St. Pats. In 2005, Dublin City played the first 10 games of their season in the ground, under a similar arrangement. Richmond Park is usually used by non-league clubs in surrounding areas when they qualify for the FAI Cup.

It staged its first European game in July 1996 when Slovan Bratislava visited in a 1996-97 UEFA Cup tie.

In 2005, the board of St. Patrick's Athletic F.C. spoke to their fans about a potential move to a new municipal stadium in Tallaght where they would share with Shamrock Rovers. Outraged by this, the club's fans revolted and a pressure group called 'Pats for Richmond' was set up to mobilise and organise opposition to the plan. In July 2006, the St. Pat's board of directors gave a clear indication of staying put by purchasing local pub Richmond House (also known as McDowells) in order to give the club's fans a social base.

In 2006 the club qualified for Europe for the first time since 2002 via the 2006 FAI Cup Final and with the club needing a bigger seating capacity to play in the UEFA Cup, the grass bank behind the Inchicore End goal was dug up and levelled out with concrete and a new temporary stand was built made up of a metal frame and wooden boards. In 2011, at the UEFA Europa League clash between Pats and ÍBV of Iceland, a supporter fell through one of the wooden boards while celebrating a goal. This led to the top half of the stand being closed for the next round against Shakhter Karagandy from Kazakhstan and the stand being closed entirely for the remainder of the 2011 season. Before the start of the 2012 season, any wooden boards that were deemed dangerous were swapped with safe ones from the top half of the stand that remained closed, and the bottom half of the stand was reopened for the Saints 5-1 hammering of Shamrock Rovers and remained open for the rest of the season. There was only two games that were an exception to the stand being open, the Europa League game, once again against ÍBV, when the UEFA delegate deemed the stand unsafe to use for supporters and the next round of the Europa League against Bosnian side Široki Brijeg when once again the UEFA delegate deemed the stand unsafe, but his decision was overruled by the Garda Síochána due to overcrowding in the Main Stand as a result of the tickets being oversold. Midway through the 2013 season, the St.Pat's Supporters Club, the Patron Saints, donated €50,000 to the club for the stand to be dismantled and rebuilt using metal flooring instead of wooden. The first time the new stand was used was a sold-out fixture against Lithuanian side Žalgiris in the UEFA Europe League on 11 July 2013. the stand was officially opened on 27 July 2013 in front of Supporters, Players and Management and given the official name of 'The Patrons' Stand'.

On 11 April 2018, St Patrick's Athletic announced plans to leave their Richmond Park home in favour of a move across the road to the St Michael's Estate site, with plans to create a 12,000 seater state of the art stadium and shopping facility with the working name of the Richmond Arena, hoping to be ready to play in by 2022 pending Dublin City Council's decision on the site and planning permission being granted.

In 2020, Richmond Park played host to the SSE Airtricity League Relegation/Promotion Playoff final between Sherbourne and Longford Town behind closed doors due to Covid-19, Longford ended up winning 1-0 via a Rob Manley Goal.

Facilities
The main stand seats 1,800 people. Behind one goal, at the Inchicore end, space was constructed into a new uncovered stand in time for the 2007 UEFA Cup campaign of St Patrick's Athletic F.C. This stand seats 1,000 and is known as the West (or 'New') Stand. The hardcore St. Pat's supporters have traditionally gathered at the other end, in the 'Shed End', though in more recent times the Shed has housed the away supporters while the more vocal Pat's fans have moved to the main stand. Although known locally as the "Shed End" the official name is the John Minnock stand, as it was financed with money received from his transfer to Charlton Athletic. It was originally a fully covered terrace before half the roof was removed in the early 2000s and the other half in early 2020, leaving it as an uncovered terrace. The Camac terrace, across from the main stand, is used by home fans, and named after the river that runs behind it. The Camac holds the ground's TV gantry.

Other uses
Richmond Park hosted Ireland's first-ever outdoor rock festival on 4 September 1970. Headlined by Mungo Jerry, the lineup also featured one of the earliest performances of the then recently formed Thin Lizzy. A crowd of several thousand had been expected but, in the event, widespread rumours of a Garda drugs bust and poor weather kept the attendance to an estimated 800.

Notable players
List of players that have been included in squads at senior international tournaments to have played at Richmond Park, in order of their first appearance at the ground.

Gallery

References

External links
 Directions to the stadium from stpatsfc.com

Buildings and structures in Dublin (city)
Association football venues in the Republic of Ireland
Sports venues in Dublin (city)
St Patrick's Athletic F.C.
Shamrock Rovers F.C.
Association football venues in County Dublin